Conus easoni is a species of sea snail, a marine gastropod mollusk in the family Conidae, the cone snails, cone shells or cones.

These snails are predatory and venomous. They are capable of "stinging" humans.

Description
The length of the shell of the holotype attains 30 mm.

Distribution
This marine species of cone snail occurs in the Pacific Ocean and is endemic to the Marquesas.

References

 Petuch E.J. & Berschauer D.P. (2018). Ten new cone shells from Indonesia, the Marquesas Islands, Brazil, and Pacific Panama. The Festivus. 50(1): 17-35.

easoni
Gastropods described in 2018